Pine Creek is a tributary of the Allegheny River located in Allegheny County in the U.S. state of Pennsylvania.

Course

Pine Creek joins the Allegheny River at the borough of Etna.

Tributaries
(Mouth at the Allegheny River)

Little Pine Creek (west bank)
Little Pine Creek (east bank)
Willow Run
Montour Run
North Fork Pine Creek
Wexford Run

See also

 List of rivers of Pennsylvania
 List of tributaries of the Allegheny River

References

External links

U.S. Geological Survey: PA stream gaging stations
Pine Creek Watershed Coalition

Rivers of Pennsylvania
Tributaries of the Allegheny River
Rivers of Allegheny County, Pennsylvania